Malye Vsegodichi is a rural locality (a selo) in Malyginskoye Rural Settlement, Kovrovsky District, Vladimir Oblast, Russia. The population was 25 as of 2010.

Geography 
Malye Vsegodichi is located on the Uvod River, 17 km north of Kovrov (the district's administrative centre) by road. Bolshiye Vsegodichi is the nearest rural locality.

References 

Rural localities in Kovrovsky District